Nancy MacBeth  ( Elliott; born December 29, 1948) is a Canadian politician who was the leader of the Alberta Liberal Party and Leader of the Opposition from 1998 to 2001. She was the first female opposition leader in the province's history.

Early life
Born in Edmonton, Alberta, MacBeth received a Bachelor of Arts at the University of Alberta, in French and Russian; studying Université Laval, studying French Canadian literature. She subsequently worked as an executive assistant for several Alberta cabinet ministers.

Early political career
MacBeth, then known as Nancy Betkowski, first entered electoral politics as an Alberta Progressive Conservative Party Member of the Legislative Assembly (MLA) for the riding of Edmonton-Glenora from 1986 to 1993 in the government of Don Getty. She was Minister of Education from 1986 to 1988, and was then appointed Minister of Health, serving in that position until 1992.

She then ran as a candidate in the party's 1992 leadership convention against Ralph Klein.  Regarded by the membership as a Red Tory, Betkowski became the preferred candidate of the party establishment.  However, Klein's populist appeal won him the leadership, and Betkowski did not stand as a candidate in the 1993 election.

Liberal leader
She subsequently married portfolio manager and financial writer Hilliard MacBeth.

She then returned to politics in 1998, running for the leadership of the Alberta Liberals after the resignation of Grant Mitchell. Elected to be the MLA for Edmonton-McClung, MacBeth tried to capitalize on discontent with Klein's government in some Alberta communities by reaching out to disaffected Red Tories, but proved unable to connect with voters.

In the 2001 provincial election, the Liberals won only seven seats, less than half as many as they had held before the election. Among the losses was MacBeth's own seat of Edmonton-McClung. The election left the party a million dollar debt that took about 10 years to pay off.

She left politics again, and was succeeded by Ken Nicol as party leader.

References

1948 births
Alberta Liberal Party MLAs
Female Canadian political party leaders
Leaders of the Alberta Liberal Party
Living people
Members of the Executive Council of Alberta
Politicians from Edmonton
Progressive Conservative Association of Alberta MLAs
Women MLAs in Alberta
Women government ministers of Canada